Nomada adusta, is a species of bee belonging to the family Apidae.

References

External links
 http://animaldiversity.org/accounts/Nomada_adusta/classification/
 https://www.academia.edu/7390502/AN_UPDATED_CHECKLIST_OF_BEES_OF_SRI_LANKA_WITH_NEW_RECORDS

Nomadinae
Insects described in 1875